Hierankl is a German award-winning family drama which premiered on 1 July 2003 at the Munich Film Festival. The modern Heimatfilm, named after a district in Surberg, Germany, is the film debut of writer and director Hans Steinbichler.

It received several nominations and awards, among them the 2006 Adolf Grimme Award for acting, cinematography, writing and direction.

Cast 
Source:

 Johanna Wokalek – Lene
 Barbara Sukowa – Rosemarie
 Josef Bierbichler – Lukas
 Peter Simonischek – Goetz Hildebrand
 Frank Giering – Paul
 Alexander Beyer – Vincenz

References

Further reading

External links 
 

2003 films
German drama films
Films set in Bavaria
Grimme-Preis for fiction winners

Incest in film
2000s German films
Films directed by Hans Steinbichler